Mathias Råheim (born 14 September 1951 in Viksdalen) is a Norwegian politician for the Conservative Party.

He served as a deputy representative to the Norwegian Parliament from Sogn og Fjordane during the terms 1997–2001 and 2001–2005.

Råheim has been a member of Gaular municipality council from 1979 to 1988 and as deputy mayor since 1999. He has been a member of Sogn og Fjordane county council since 1983, serving as deputy county mayor since 1999. He chaired the county party chapter from 1990 to 2000.

References
Mathias Råheim at NRK Sogn og Fjordane County Encyclopedia 

1951 births
Living people
Conservative Party (Norway) politicians
Deputy members of the Storting
Sogn og Fjordane politicians